The following lists events that happened during 1983 in Laos.

Incumbents
President: Souphanouvong 
Prime Minister: Kaysone Phomvihane

Events

December
1 December - Lao National Television is established.

References

 
Years of the 20th century in Laos
Laos
1980s in Laos
Laos